Jumanji: The Next Level is a 2019 American fantasy adventure comedy film directed by Jake Kasdan, who co-wrote the script with Jeff Pinkner and Scott Rosenberg. The film is the fourth installment in the Jumanji film series and the sequel to Jumanji: Welcome to the Jungle (2017). It stars Dwayne Johnson, Jack Black, Kevin Hart, Karen Gillan, Nick Jonas, Alex Wolff, Morgan Turner, Ser'Darius Blain, and Madison Iseman reprising their roles from the previous film, while Awkwafina, Danny Glover, and Danny DeVito join the cast. The film's plot takes place two years after Welcome to the Jungle, in which the same group of teenagers, along with an old friend and two unwitting additions, become trapped in Jumanji once again. There, they all find themselves facing new problems and challenges with both old and new avatars, while having to save the land from a new villain to escape.

Principal photography took place between January 21 to May 11, 2019, in locations including Atlanta, New Mexico, Alberta, and Hawaii.

Jumanji: The Next Level was released in the United States on December 13, 2019, by Sony Pictures Releasing. The film received generally positive reviews from critics and grossed $801.7 million worldwide against a $125–132 million budget, becoming the tenth-highest-grossing film of 2019. A sequel is in development.

Plot

Two years after their adventures in Jumanji, Spencer Gilpin, Anthony "Fridge" Johnson, Martha Kaply, and Bethany Walker plan to meet up over Christmas break to discuss their first year out of school. The night before, Spencer, feeling despondent that his life isn't as glamorous as his friends', gets out Jumanji. When he is late to the meet-up, his friends visit his mother and are greeted by Spencer's grandfather, Eddie, and Eddie's estranged friend and former business partner, Milo Walker. Fridge, Martha, and Bethany realize Spencer has gone into the game and follow. Eddie and Milo are also sucked into the game inadvertently while Bethany is left behind, forcing her to go to the other Jumanji player, Alex Vreeke, for help.

Inside the game, Martha becomes the avatar Ruby Roundhouse. Fridge becomes Professor Sheldon Oberon (who had been Bethany previously), while Eddie and Milo become Dr. Smolder Bravestone and Franklin "Mouse" Finbar (who had been Spencer and Fridge respectively). After explaining Jumanji's rules to Eddie and Milo, they encounter non-player character Nigel Billingsley, the game's guide, who reveals that Jumanji is suffering from a massive drought. To leave the game, they must end the drought by recovering a magical necklace known as the Falcon Heart, stolen by warlord and Bravestone's rival, Jurgen the Brutal.  Transported to a desert to pursue Jurgen, and narrowly escaping a herd of ostriches, the team encounters Spencer who has a new avatar, a skilled female thief called Ming Fleetfoot.

While attempting to escape the desert, they face new challenges, along with collecting a Jumanji Berry and discovering a pool of glowing green water that allows them to switch avatars. However, the group struggles to adjust to the avatar changes: Fridge has trouble figuring out how Oberon is even relevant to the game, Spencer's meekness makes him unable to fully utilize Ming's skills, Milo's tendency to 'take the scenic route' when talking makes him unable to relay vital information quickly, and Eddie's carelessness costs the group several lives, including after picking a fight with Milo when he reveals he sold their diner behind Eddie's back, forcing him into retirement. Traveling to a forest beyond the desert, the group crosses a series of rope bridges, while being attacked by a group of mandrills.

Successfully crossing the bridges, they are reunited with Alex, as his avatar Jefferson "Seaplane" McDonough, and Bethany, who is now Cyclone, a black stallion who can only be understood by Finbar. As they rest from their battle with the mandrills, Eddie learns Milo is terminally ill and wants to make amends before he dies, which leads them to reconcile.

Working together, the group traverses to Mt. Zhatmire and finds a river with the same glowing green water, allowing Spencer, Bethany, and Fridge to return to their original avatars again while Eddie and Milo end up as Ming and Cyclone. Shortly after, Eddie and Milo are captured by Jurgen's soldiers. Spencer, Martha, Fridge, Bethany, and Alex split up to infiltrate the fortress, rescue their teammates and get the Falcon Heart. While scaling the ice wall, Martha asks Spencer why he left his old life and her, and he says her success made him insecure. She consoles him, reminding him that friends are needed most when we feel scared and insecure.

After rescuing Ming and Cyclone, Fridge and Bethany try to fool Jurgen into giving them the Falcon Heart necklace by claiming to be a pair of brothers he was supposed to meet. However, they are soon revealed to be lying. The resulting fight allows Jurgen to escape onto his airship followed closely by Spencer. Realizing Jurgen is vulnerable to the Jumanji Berry they collected, Spencer incapacitates Jurgen and sends him falling to his death, allowing him to steal the necklace. Ming and Cyclone (who is revealed to be a Pegasus) fly towards the sky, letting the sunlight touch the necklace, therefore completing the game.

Returning the Falcon Heart to Nigel, Milo decides to stay behind and protect the land. Upon returning to the real world, Spencer teaches his grandfather about video games. Having gotten over his resentment, Eddie convinces Nora, the owner of his old diner, to hire him as a manager.

Cast

 Dwayne Johnson as Dr. Xander "Smolder" Bravestone: A player character and Eddie's avatar initially, before once again becoming Spencer's avatar. He takes the form of a strong, confident archaeologist and explorer.
 Johnson also portrays Bravestone's father in a flashback, with Zachary Tzegaegbe portraying the young Bravestone
 Jack Black as Professor Sheldon "Shelly" Oberon: A player character and Fridge's new avatar. Martha briefly controls the avatar, and he later once again becomes Bethany's. Professor Oberon takes the form of an overweight, male expert in many scientific fields. 
 Kevin Hart as Franklin "Mouse" Finbar: A player character, Milo's avatar initially, who later becomes Fridge's avatar once again. Finbar takes the form of a diminutive zoologist and weapons carrier. 
 Karen Gillan as Ruby Roundhouse: A player character and Martha's Avatar, who takes the form of a scantily-clad commando. She is briefly controlled by Fridge. 
 Nick Jonas as Jefferson "Seaplane" McDonough: A player character, and Alex's avatar once again, who takes the form of an aircraft pilot. 
 Awkwafina as Ming Fleetfoot: A new Jumanji player character and Spencer's new avatar, who later becomes Eddie's avatar. Fleetfoot takes the form of a thief with skills in burglary, pick-pocketing, and lock picking. 
 Rory McCann as Jurgen the Brutal, an NPC presented as a violent warlord who is responsible for the murders of Bravestone's parents
 Alex Wolff as Spencer Gilpin: A new college student struggling to adjust to his new life and Martha's boyfriend
 Morgan Turner as Martha Kaply: A new college student and Spencer's girlfriend
 Ser'Darius Blain as Anthony "Fridge" Johnson: A new college student A friend of Spencer, Martha, and Bethany
 Madison Iseman as Bethany Walker: A new college student One of the four friends who experienced the previous Jumanji, now a world traveler
 Danny DeVito as Edward "Eddie" Gilpin: Spencer's grandfather, who resents Milo for selling the diner they co-owned
 Danny Glover as Milo Walker: Eddie's estranged friend, whose falling out resulted from him selling their diner
 Rhys Darby as Nigel Billingsley: An NPC who serves as the primary guide for its players
 Colin Hanks as Alex Vreeke: A previous Jumanji player, now raising a family.
 Marin Hinkle as Janice Gilpin: Spencer's mother and Eddie's daughter
 Vince Pisani as Pharmacy Manager
 Dorothy Steel as Village Elder
Bebe Neuwirth reprises her role as Nora Shepherd, aunt of the first film's protagonists Peter and Judy Shepherd who attempted to turn the Parrish House into a Bed and Breakfast. Also featured as NPCs in Jumanji are Jennifer Patino as Bravestone's mother, Massi Furlan as crime boss Switchblade, Dania Ramirez as Switchblade's seductive wife, John Ross Bowie as Jurgen's butler Cavendish, and DeObia Oparei as an elevator guard. Danny DeVito's daughter, Lucy DeVito, also portrays the NPC of a maiden and Lamorne Morris plays the heater repairman.

Production

Development
Following the release of Jumanji: Welcome to the Jungle, Sony began development on the sequel. Kasdan returned to direct the sequel, with Rosenberg and Pinkner again writing the script and Johnson, Hart, Black, and Gillan reprising their roles.

During the film's development, Black confirmed the new film as being a fourth Jumanji film because of Zathura: A Space Adventure (2005), serving as the second film and sharing continuity with the other films of the series, with Jumanji: Welcome to the Jungle serving as the third film. According to Kasdan the film used the working title J-19. The film's title was revealed as Jumanji: The Next Level.

Casting
Awkwafina, Danny DeVito, and Danny Glover joined the film in January 2019. Alex Wolff, Ser'Darius Blain, Madison Iseman, Morgan Turner, and Nick Jonas were hired to reprise their roles in February. In March, Dania Ramirez joined the cast of the film. That same month, Rhys Darby was confirmed to reprise his role in the film. Colin Hanks joined the cast in May to reprise his role.

Filming
Filming began on January 21, 2019, and took place in Atlanta, New Mexico, Calgary, Fortress Mountain Resort, Algodones Dunes in California, and Hawaii before wrapping on May 11. Johnson made a reported $23.5 million for his role.

Release

Theatrical

In the United States and Canada, the film was released on December 13, 2019, in RealD 3D, Dolby Cinema, IMAX, IMAX 3D, 4DX, and ScreenX formats. It was released on December 5 in China, Singapore, Malaysia, and several other Asian countries (and also in the Czech Republic). In the Nordic countries and the Netherlands, the film premiered in cinemas day later. The film's Australian release date was December 26.

Home media
The film was released on digital by Sony Pictures Home Entertainment on March 3, 2020, and was released on 4K Ultra HD Blu-ray, and DVD on March 17.

In April 2021, Sony signed a deal giving Disney access to their legacy content, including the Jumanji franchise to stream on Disney+ and Hulu and appear on Disney's linear television networks. Disney's access to Sony's titles would come following their availability on Netflix.

Reception

Box office
Jumanji: The Next Level grossed $320.3 million in the United States and Canada, and $479.7 million in other countries, for a worldwide total of $800.1 million, against a production budget of about $125–132 million. Deadline Hollywood calculated that the net profit of the film was $236million.

In the United States and Canada, the film was released alongside Black Christmas and Richard Jewell, and was projected to gross $45–55 million from 4,227 theaters in its opening weekend. The film made $19.7 million on its first day, including $4.7 million from Thursday night previews. It went on to debut to $59.3 million, topping the box office. It made $26.5 million in its second weekend, finishing second behind Star Wars: The Rise of Skywalker. The following weekend the film made $35.3 million (a total of $59.2 million over the five-day Christmas period), then $26.5 million the next, remaining in second behind The Rise of Skywalker both times. After the COVID-19 pandemic closed most theaters across the U.S. and Canada in March, the film continued to play at drive-ins during the following weeks; it made $217,800 in its 24th weekend and $186,800 in its 25th weekend. The film passed the $800 million mark worldwide on July 7, 2020, thanks to drive-in grosses in the U.S. and theaters re-opening in other countries.

Critical response
The website's critics consensus reads: "Like many classic games, Jumanji: The Next Level retains core components of what came before while adding enough fresh bits to keep things playable." On Metacritic, the film has a weighted average score of 58 out of 100 based on 37 critics, indicating "mixed or average reviews". Audiences polled by CinemaScore gave the film an average grade of "A−" on an A+ to F scale, while those at PostTrak gave it an average 3.5 out of 5 stars, with 58% saying they would definitely recommend it.

Peter Debruge of Variety wrote: "More often than not, effects-driven blockbusters get dumber as the series goes along, but Jumanji: The Next Level invents some fun ideas to keep things fresh." Debruge calls Johnson's Danny DeVito impression "unintentionally hilarious", and is mildly critical of some of the off color jokes, but concludes: "The storytelling may be sloppy in parts, but the cast's collective charisma more than compensates." Peter Travers of Rolling Stone is positive about the remixing of the characters having "major comedy benefits" and Travers welcomes the introduction of Awkwafina. He found the plot difficult to follow and not worth the effort, but says "what matters are the laughs and the FX". Peter Bradshaw of The Guardian wrote: "What gives Jumanji its likability is that it has the emphases and comedy beats of an animation, but also the performance technique of live action – and the occasional reshuffling of avatars and players lets the actors show off a little bit further. Jumanjis next level is rather satisfying."

Accolades
At the 2020 Kids' Choice Awards, Jumanji: The Next Level received nominations for Favorite Animated Movie and Favorite Movie Actor, both of which Johnson won it and Hart lost to him. The film's visual effects received the Asian Academy Creative Award for Best Visual or Special FX in TV Series or Feature Film at the second ceremony, and a nomination for Best Visual Effects or Animation at the 10th AACTA Awards. It was nominated at the Golden Trailer Awards for Best Fantasy Adventure and Best Comedy/Drama TrailerByte for a Feature Film. At the 46th Saturn Awards, it received a nomination for Best Fantasy Film.

Sequel
Dwayne Johnson revealed in an interview that the villain Jurgen the Brutal is actually an avatar of an unknown character, and would be explored in a potential sequel. In March 2020, Jake Kasdan confirmed early developments for a follow-up film. Kasdan confirmed plans to maintain the core cast of the previous two films. The following month, the filmmaker stated that the story for the next installment is in development. In November 2021, producer Hiram Garcia confirmed that a pitch was developed and is ready to be presented to the studio after Kasdan finishes his work on the upcoming Red One. The following month he reiterated plans to develop the next Jumanji, once filming on Red One wraps, stating that this time-table works with the actors' busy production schedules. In March 2023, Hart indicated that it would be the final film in the series.

Notes

References

External links

 Sony Pictures page
 

2019 films
2019 3D films
2019 adventure films
American adventure comedy films
American fantasy adventure films
American fantasy comedy films
American sequel films
Columbia Pictures films
Films about video games
Films about animals
Films based on children's books
Films based on works by Chris Van Allsburg
Films directed by Jake Kasdan
Films produced by Matt Tolmach
Films scored by Henry Jackman
Films with screenplays by Scott Rosenberg
Films set in 1980
Films set in 2019
Films set in New Hampshire
Jumanji
Jungle adventure films
Seven Bucks Productions films
IMAX films
2010s adventure comedy films
2010s fantasy comedy films
2010s fantasy adventure films
Films about virtual reality
Body swapping in films
2019 comedy films
Films shot in Alberta
Films shot in Georgia (U.S. state)
Films shot in New Mexico
Films shot in Hawaii
2010s English-language films
2010s American films